Emanuele Morini (born 31 January 1982, in Rome) is an Italian football player who plays as a forward for ASD Play Eur.

Career
Morini was educated in A.S. Roma's youth academy, but not played games for the club before moving to English side Bolton Wanderers in September 2000. After only three games for Bolton between 2000 and 2002, he signed with Greek Panachaiki, where he appeared in 25 Alpha Ethniki matches. In 2004 Morini returned to Italy and in the next five seasons played for Vicenza Calcio, A.C. Lumezzane and S.S. Sambenedettese Calcio.

On 5 September 2009 Morini relocated to Bulgaria and signed a contract with Botev Plovdiv. A few days later, Morini scored his first goal for the club in a match against Litex Lovech. On 30 October 2009, Morini scored the crucial winning goal against the city rivals Lokomotiv Plovdiv, and helped his team to win the derby with 1–0. He returned to Italy, following Botev Plovdiv's administrative relegation from the first division.

In January 2010, Morini returned to Italy playing with Foggia. In 2011, Morini moved to Cynthia 1920 where he scored 7 goals. In 2012, Morini moved to Viterbese Calcio where he scored 11 goals in 33 matches.
In September 2012, Morini relocated again to Bulgaria and signed a contract with Shumen 2010.
In January 2012, Morini requested to terminate the contract with Shumen 2010.
In 2013–14 he played with Lupa Roma. He was the top-goalscorer of the team as they were promoted to Lega Pro. He had a fine form with Viterbese, having scored 8 goals in 15 matches.

In August 2015, he went to Albania and signed a one-year contract with Albanian Superliga side Partizani Tirana, taking the vacant number 34 for the 2015–16 season.

References

External links
 Player Profile at tuttocalciatori.net
 Emanuele Morini Youtube dedicated channel with its best plays

1982 births
Living people
Italian footballers
Association football midfielders
Bolton Wanderers F.C. players
Panachaiki F.C. players
L.R. Vicenza players
A.S. Sambenedettese players
Botev Plovdiv players
Calcio Foggia 1920 players
First Professional Football League (Bulgaria) players
Expatriate footballers in England
Expatriate footballers in Greece
Expatriate footballers in Bulgaria
Italian expatriates in Bulgaria